Sugar Creek is a waterway located in the U.S. state of Indiana. The largest community on the waterway is Crawfordsville.

Sugar Creek flows through two Indiana state parks, Shades and Turkey Run, and is a popular tourist and canoeist attraction.  The creek and its many small tributaries are noted for the picturesque canyons and small waterfalls they have created in the rocky terrain. The fictional The Sugar Creek Gang series of books is based along this creek.

The Darlington Covered Bridge spans Sugar Creek in Franklin Township, Montgomery County, Indiana. It was listed on the National Register of Historic Places in 1990.

See also
List of rivers of Indiana

References

External links
 Friends of Sugar Creek Facebook page

Rivers of Indiana
Rivers of Boone County, Indiana
Rivers of Montgomery County, Indiana
Rivers of Parke County, Indiana
Tributaries of the Wabash River